IC 2560 is a spiral galaxy lying over 110 million light-years away from Earth in the constellation of Antlia. It has a distinct bar structure in the center.

References

External links 
 

Barred spiral galaxies
Antlia
2560
029993
-05-25-001
375-4
10140-3318